Paula (reissued as The Silent Voice) is a 1952 American film noir drama film directed by Rudolph Maté, and starring Loretta Young, Kent Smith, and Alexander Knox. It was produced and distributed by Columbia Pictures.

Plot
Distraught after her second miscarriage, and learning definitively she could never have children, Paula Rogers, while driving at night, accidentally injures a child. Confused, and also expected to attend a function that honors her husband, Paula doesn't follow the child to the hospital, as she should. She attempts to tell her husband about the incident, but has trouble finding the right time.

Later, overcome with remorse, she looks to get close to this child and becomes a helper at the hospital. The child is an orphan with limited health care available. The doctor recognizes Paula's need to be useful and asks if she would become his speech therapist and guardian. She finds meaning and purpose in her life as she engages the little boy in intensive therapy necessary to recover his ability to speak.

Cast

References

Bibliography
 Dick, Bernard F. Hollywood Madonna: Loretta Young. University Press of Mississippi, 2011.

External links

 
 

1952 films
Films directed by Rudolph Maté
American drama films
1952 drama films
Columbia Pictures films
Films scored by George Duning
Films about deaf people
Films about amnesia
American black-and-white films
Films with screenplays by James Poe
1950s English-language films
1950s American films